Abbotsford West is a provincial electoral district in the Canadian province of British Columbia established by the Electoral Districts Act, 2008. It was first contested in the 2009 British Columbia general election.

History

Member of Legislative Assembly 
On account of the realignment of electoral boundaries, most incumbents did not represent the entirety of their listed district during the preceding legislative term. Mike de Jong, British Columbia Liberal Party was re-elected in 1996, 2001 and 2005 to the Abbotsford-Mount Lehman riding. He was also elected in this new redistricted riding in the 2009 election.

Electoral history 

|-

 
|NDP
|Taranjit Purewal
|align="right"|5,106
|align="right"|31.69
|align="right"| +0.4

|- bgcolor="white"
!align="left" colspan=3|Total
!align="right"|16,111
!align="right"|100.00%
!align="right"|
|}

References

British Columbia provincial electoral districts
Politics of Abbotsford, British Columbia
Provincial electoral districts in Greater Vancouver and the Fraser Valley